Linguaglossa is a town and comune in the Metropolitan City of Catania in Sicily, located on the northern side of Mount Etna where there is also a ski resort with view on the Ionian sea. It was founded on a lava stream in 1566.

Main sights

Sights of Linguaglossa include the Chiesa Madre, also known as La Matrice, erected in 1613, and the Church of Saint Giles, who is the town's patron saint.
The Francesco Messina Museum offers a collection of work of Francesco Messina (portraits, horses, ballerinas) and Salvatore Incorpora.

References

External links

Municipalities of the Metropolitan City of Catania